Gobiobotia is a genus of cyprinid fish that is found in eastern Asia. Species are typically small bottom dwellers.

Species
There are currently 19 recognized species in this genus:
 Gobiobotia abbreviata P. W. Fang & Ki. Fu. Wang, 1931
 Gobiobotia brevibarba T. Mori, 1935
 Gobiobotia brevirostris Yi-Yu Chen & W. H. Cao, 1977
 Gobiobotia cheni Bănărescu & Nalbant, 1966
 Gobiobotia filifer (Garman, 1912)
 Gobiobotia guilingensis Yi-Yu Chen, 1989
 Gobiobotia homalopteroidea Rendahl (de), 1932
 Gobiobotia jiangxiensis E. Zhang & H. Z. Liu, 1995
 Gobiobotia kolleri Bănărescu & Nalbant, 1966
 Gobiobotia lii X. Chen, 2022
 Gobiobotia longibarba P. W. Fang & Ki. Fu. Wang, 1931
 Gobiobotia macrocephala T. Mori, 1935
 Gobiobotia meridionalis Yi-Yu Chen & W. H. Cao, 1977
 Gobiobotia naktongensis T. Mori, 1935
 Gobiobotia nicholsi Bănărescu & Nalbant, 1966
 Gobiobotia pappenheimi Kreyenberg, 1911 (Eightbarbel gudgeon)
 Gobiobotia paucirastella M. L. Zheng & J. P. Yan, 1986
 Gobiobotia tungi P. W. Fang, 1933
 Gobiobotia yuanjiangensis Yi-Yu Chen & W. H. Cao, 1977

References

 
Fish of Asia
Freshwater fish genera
Ray-finned fish genera